Graeme William Aldridge (born 15 November 1977) in Christchurch is a former New Zealand cricketer who plays first class cricket for Northern Districts Knights as a specialist bowler since 1998–99. Aldridge has represented New Zealand A once, on tour of Sri Lanka in 2005–06. 

Aldridge did not play any cricket since 2015.

International career
He played both of his ODIs and one off Twenty20 match against Zimbabwe in October, 2011 during New Zealand tour of Zimbabwe. He is the 50th T20I cap for New Zealand.

External links
 
 

1977 births
Living people
New Zealand cricketers
New Zealand One Day International cricketers
New Zealand Twenty20 International cricketers
Northern Districts cricketers
North Island cricketers